This is a list of townships, known as "lots", for the Canadian province of Prince Edward Island, some of which also act as Prince Edward Island's census subdivisions.

History
After being ceded the island in the Treaty of Paris in 1763, Great Britain immediately sought to bring its own settlers to occupy the vacated Acadian holdings.  In 1764, Great Britain ordered a survey of what was then called St. John's Island which was completed in 1766.  As with other surveys of Britain's North American territories, the survey of St. John's Island was done with the primary goal of encouraging settlement at minimal cost to the treasury.  A feudal system was proposed, along the lines of the European experience with lease-tenure.

Three counties of roughly 500,000 acres (2,000 km2): Prince, Queens, and Kings; were surveyed (Kings County being the smallest), each of which had a "royalty" or shire town.  Each county was subdivided into five 100,000 acre (400 km2) parishes (for the Church of England) - Kings County having four parishes on account of its smaller size - and each parish was further subdivided into roughly 20,000 acre (80 km2) townships or "lots".  Each township/lot were to be granted to individuals with certain conditions of settlement (i.e. personally finance and transport settlers to the island; settlers would be obliged to clear land for their farms and pay annual quitrents which, over time would pay off the initial outlay of the owner and eventually turn a profit).  Since more individuals were interested than there were lots available, the government of Great Britain devised a lottery for the sixty four (of sixty seven) lots being granted.

St. John's Island was renamed to Prince Edward Island on November 29, 1798.  After a contentious century of conflict between property owners/landlords (many of whom were absentee) and the largely poor peasant leaseholders, the last of the property owners was bought out in the 19th century after financing was made available to the Government of Prince Edward Island expressly for buying out the landlords under Prince Edward Island's Terms of Union for entry into Confederation on July 1, 1873.

For further information, see A Brief Summary of the History of Prince Edward Island - taken from Hutchinson's Prince Edward Island Directory, 1864.

Today, the townships/lots continue to exist on paper and in maps as Prince Edward Island's census subdivisions.

 
Townships
Prince Edward Island